Breivik (means "broad cove") may refer to:

People
 Breivik (surname)
 Anders Behring Breivik, perpetrator of the 2011 attacks in Norway which killed 77 people
 Marit Breivik, prominent Norwegian women's handball coach

Places
 Breivik, Finnmark, in Hasvik municipality, Troms og Finnmark, Norway
 Breivik, Nordland, in Bodø municipality, Nordland, Norway
 Breivik, Telemark, in Fyresdal municipality, Telemark, Norway
 Breivik, Vestland, in Askøy municipality, Vestland, Norway

See also 
 Breivik Geofarm

 Breidvik (disambiguation)
 Breivika (disambiguation)
 Brevik (disambiguation)